

Highest Grossing Films 
 Mayura
 Daari Tappida Maga
 Shubhamangala

Released Films 
The following is a list of films produced in the Kannada film industry in India in 1975, presented in alphabetical order.

References

External links
 http://www.bharatmovies.com/kannada/info/moviepages.htm
 http://www.kannadastore.com/

See also

Kannada films of 1974
Kannada films of 1976

1975
Kannada
Films, Kannada